Specklinia turrialbae is a species of orchid plant native to Costa Rica.

References 

turrialbae
Flora of Costa Rica